Konchi-in (金地院) is a Buddhist temple in Sakyō-ku, Kyoto, western Japan. 

The temple is renowned for its Crane and Turtle Garden.

References

Further reading

External links 

Buddhist temples in Kyoto
Nanzen-ji temples
Special Places of Scenic Beauty